Tebenna bjerkandrella is a moth of the family Choreutidae first described by Carl Peter Thunberg in 1784. It is found from Europe, Morocco, Madeira and the Canary Islands through central Asia to Japan. It has also been recorded from South Africa.

The wingspan is 11–14 mm.

The larvae feed on Inula salicina, Carduus, Carlina, Cirsium, Gnaphalium, Helichrysum species.

Subspecies
Tebenna bjerkandrella bjerkandrella
Tebenna bjerkandrella caucasica (Danilevsky, 1976)

References

External links
"05278 Tebenna bjerkandrella (Thunberg, 1784) - Silberfleck-Spreizflügelfalter Artabgrenzung unklar!". Lepiforum e.V. Retrieved December 4, 2019. 

Tebenna
Moths of Asia
Moths of Europe
Moths of Africa
Moths described in 1784